The Erb Range is a rugged mountain range rising to  between Kosco Glacier and Shackleton Glacier in the Queen Maud Mountains, and extending north from Anderson Heights to Mount Speed on the west side of the Ross Ice Shelf. The range was photographed from aircraft of the United States Antarctic Service Expedition, 1939–41, and surveyed by A.P. Crary, leader of the U.S. Ross Ice Shelf Traverse, 1957–58. Named by the Advisory Committee on Antarctic Names in 2008 after Karl A. Erb who played a major role in guiding the United States Antarctic Program as both the NSF Senior Science Advisor in the mid 1990s and subsequently as Director of the Office of Polar Programs from 1998 until 2007 and beyond. During his tenure as the Senior Science Advisor, he helped to guide NSF through the process of justifying and then securing Congressional funding for the redevelopment of the South Pole Station.

References

Mountain ranges of the Ross Dependency